Kalsi (Kālsī) is a town in Dehradun District, Uttarakhand. It is known for the Rock edicts of Kalsi, a group of major inscriptions by emperor Ashoka. The Kalsi rock contains the Major Rock Edicts 1 to 14.

The Kalsi rock edict of Ashoka No.13, mentions the Greek kings Antiochus, Ptolemy, Antigonus, Magas and Alexander by name, as recipients of his teachings.

References

Edicts of Ashoka
Cities and towns in Dehradun district